Cabangan, officially the Municipality of Cabangan,  is a 4th class municipality in the province of Zambales, Philippines. According to the 2020 census, it has a population of 28,118 people.

History

Cabangan is a coastal town that was originally located in Barrio San Isidro. Its strategic location near the South China Sea was very compelling that a group of few families whose principal source of livelihood was fishing decided to settle in that area.

There was a time when this town was frequently visited by Moro pirates who were notoriously known for their skill in using spears. They came by means of their swift vintas and murdered some of the inhabitants and looted their properties. Because of this the early settlers decided to go further from the sea and left San Isidro.

On their journey of finding a new settlement area, they passed through a hill were many palm trees were growing. These trees were growing. These trees bear fruits in the shape of large pots, locally known as the “banga”. The luxuriant palm trees were abundant in the locality that they called the place “Kabangaan”. When the Americans came, they could hardly pronounce the word Kabangaan, instead they pronounced it ‘Cabangan’. Since then, the people who settled permanently in that area adopted the name Cabangan.

Cabangan was formally established in 1680. Justo Alinea (1898) was the first “Capitan Municipal,” which is equivalent to the position of the mayor at present time. The first “Presidente” Municipal was Mr. Benito Rivera, from years 1901 to 1902. He was succeeded by Mr. Antero Mora (1903-1904). In 1905, during the term of Mr. Andres Dumaplin, Botolan and Cabangan were governed by the same Presidente. The usage of the term “Presidente Municipal” ended in 1906 and Mr. Raymundo Dacoroon was elected to succeed Mr. Dumaplin. Mr. Dacoroon's term ended in 1908. After this year, the people of Cabangan elected their officials in their town.

Geography

Barangays
Cabangan is politically subdivided into 22 barangays.

 Anonang
 Apo-apo
 Arew
 Banuanbayo (poblacion)
 Cadmang-Reserva
 Camiing (St. Francis)
 Casabaan
 Del Carmen (poblacion)
 Dolores (poblacion)
 Felmida-Diaz
 Laoag
 Lomboy
 Longos
 Mabanglit
 New San Juan
 San Antonio (poblacion)
 San Isidro
 San Juan (poblacion)
 San Rafael
 Santa Rita
 Santo Niño
 Tondo

Climate

Demographics

Economy 

The Municipality of Cabangan lies on the western part of the Province of Zambales. It has a total land area of 24, 890 hectares and approximately lies within bounds it on the north, on the east by the Zambales Mountain Ranges, the Municipality of San Felipe on the south, and on the west by the West Philippine Sea.

The economy of Cabangan can be described to be operating mainly on subsistence. It is further characterized to be primarily an agricultural economy, with twenty of its twenty two barangays predominantly agricultural communities.

The municipality's main source of income is fishing, followed closely by farming and self-employment as the secondary and tertiary source of livelihood. Trade activities are done usually within barangays, as well as outside or with adjacent barangays.

Agricultural activities in the municipality, composed primarily of rice farming, are done within the months of June to August. The other crops that are produced by the town's agricultural sector are corn, root crops, legumes, leafy vegetables, fruit vegetables, and various spices. Livestock marketing is composed of pigs – hog fattening, poultry farming of broiler and native chicken, as well as carabao and cattle farming. Cabangan micro-industry are characterized by basket weaving, production of bamboo products such as furniture, furniture from rattan, ashware, broom making, and nipa frond weaving for roof thatches and as local hats or salakot.

Commercial activities in the municipality are mainly those which aim only to support local economy. Existing commercial establishments are mainly located along the major roads of Cabangan. There is only one public market, located in Barangay Dolores and is about 500 meters away from the Municipal Hall. All other crop and catch sales are done either along the coasts, and there is only one bank – The Rural Bank of Cabangan, to support banking requirements of its locals.

The municipality is accessible via the provinces of Bulacan-Pampanga and Bataan along the major highway network. It is 186 kilometers away from Manila equivalent to 3 ½ hours ride. It is accessible via the Province of Pangasinan. Road condition is good along the coastline, however, going inland, along the mountainside, roads are narrow, unpaved, and badly maintained.

The municipality has a varied topography characterized by high mountains to narrow coastal plains. The most outstanding feature observable in the municipality is the Zambales Range.

The main drainage systems in Cabangan are the Tanguay, Yabel, Kileng, Anonang Rivers, all draining westward towards the Philippine Sea. The rivers are wide with heavy floodplain deposits. Numerous small tributaries around the area.

Vegetation reflects the underlying rock types especially in the Central and Northern portions of the range. Gabbro supports dense forest at low altitudes while periodite is generally barren. Lowlands are planted with rice, root crops, and other seasonal crops. The rolling and moderately sloping areas are covered with fruit bearing trees.

References

External links

Cabangan Profile at PhilAtlas.com
[ Philippine Standard Geographic Code]
Philippine Census Information

Municipalities of Zambales